Sarika Sabrin is a Bangladeshi actress and model.

Career
Sabrin started her career in television play Camellia directed by Ashutosh Sujon and later acted in Rumali which was written by Humayun Ahmed and directed by Arun Chowdhury. She was a brand ambassador of BanglaLink Telecommunication.

Sabrin's first opportunity to perform in the commercial of the beauty product came from Amitabh Reza Chowdhury which was the advertisement of Aromatic Beauty soap. The advertisement was on air in 2008 and earned Bachsas Awards in critics choice best female model category. After that initial breakthrough she became the brand ambassador of Singer and Aromatic. Now she is the brand ambassador of Walton and Keya and regularly works with Banglalink. She has performed in the twelve commercials of Banglalink. Apart from that she performed as a model in the advertisement of Pran, Amin Jewelers, Elite Mehendi and Walton.

Personal life
Sabrin married a businessman Mahim Karim on 12 August 2014. They have one daughter, Shehrish Karim. In 2016, Sarika and Mahim filed for divorce and got separated.
On 2 February 2022, Sarika got married with Ahmed Rahi.

Filmography

Television

Other work

Web works

References 

Living people
Bangladeshi film actresses
Bangladeshi television actresses
21st-century Bangladeshi actresses
Year of birth missing (living people)